Animal is the debut studio album by Argentine singer María Becerra. It was released on 26 August 2021 by 300 Entertainment. Animal consists of two parts, with the first one being released as a separate extended play (EP) titled Animal, Pt. 1, released in February of the same year, consisting of four tracks. The second part was released alongside the album, with an additional seven songs. The album features guest vocals from Cazzu, Tiago PZK, Becky G, and Danny Ocean. It was nominated for Best Urban Music Album at the 23rd Annual Latin Grammy Awards.

Background 
In September 2020, Becerra confirmed that she had started working on her first studio album, in which collaborations with Argentine artists are coming.

On 25 February 2021, Becerra released Animal, Pt. 1, the extended play preview of what would be her first studio album. It was preceded by two singles between January and February: "Animal" with Argentine singer Cazzu and "Acaramelao"; completing the tracklist with "A Solas" and "Cerquita de Ti".

Release and cover 
The cover shows Becerra's hands holding her logo that has the shape of a heart where, metaphorically, the artist delivers her own transparent heart, between strong and fragile but that shines for all her audience.

Singles 
After the singles "Animal" and "Acaramelao" were released, the third single to be released was "Cazame" along with Argentine singer and rapper Tiago PZK. The music video for the single was filmed on Isla Martín García and directed by Julián Levy, in which Becerra can be seen as an Amazon who meets Tiago after he crashes his plane in the jungle. It reached number 6 on the Billboard Argentina Hot 100 chart. It also reached the 13 position on Monitor Latino in Uruguay.

"Mi Debilidad" was released as the second single from the album on July 29, 2021. After the announcement of the song, the singer shared through her Instagram account: 

The song reached number 6 on the Billboard Argentina Hot 100 chart.

The third single, released at the same time as the album's release, is titled "Wow Wow" with American singer Becky G. Billboard called the music track "a hitting reggaeton that has female empowerment anthem potential".

Reception

Review 
After four days of its premiere, Billboard Argentina selected Animal as the album of the week. In a positive review, Gabriel Hernando of the newspaper La Nación wrote: "even without too many innovations and preserving both the particular signs and the typical clichés of the urban genre, Animal also appears as a varied, eclectic album".

Commercial performance 
After its release, 9 of the 11 songs on the album entered Spotify Argentina. In total, it accumulated 1.2 million streams in Argentina and more than 2.7 million streams globally. The album also debuted at number five on Spotify's Top 10 Global Album Debuts chart.

In Spain, the album entered at number 49 on the PROMUSICAE chart on 7 September 2021.

Tour 
In July 2021 the singer announced "Animal Tour" with three initial shows, scheduled for October 22, 23 and 24, at the Rivadavia Theater in Buenos Aires, which sold out in less than an hour; reason why it announced new presentations, exhausting twenty-two dates. In an interview José Levy, representative of the singer, assured more than 10 functions in Córdoba, Mendoza and other provinces of the country, and soon abroad.

Track listing

Notes
 Track list was labeled and released in two parts:
 Tracks 1-4 are part of the album’s first part and EP, Animal, Pt. 1.
 Tracks 5-11 are part of the album’s second part.

Personnel 
Credits adapted from Genius.

 María Becerra – lead vocals
 Cazzu – featured vocals (track 1)
 Tiago PZK – featured vocals (track 5)
 Becky G – featured vocals (track 7)
 Danny Ocean – featured vocals (track 10)
 Big One – production (tracks 1–7, 10–11), mixing, mastering
 Súbelo NEO – production (track 8)
 Tatool – production (track 9)
 Brian Taylor – co-production, engineering

Charts

References 

2021 debut albums
María Becerra albums
Spanish-language albums